Landau Forte Academy QEMS (Formerly "Queen Elizabeth's Mercian School", until 1 September 2011) is an 11-16 secondary school with academy status located to the north of Tamworth, a market town in Staffordshire in the Midlands north of Birmingham. It is often known simply as QEMS (pronounced "quems").
Since 1 September 2011, the school has been owned and operated by the Landau Forte Charitable Trust, after being transferred from the Staffordshire LA control.

It is situated in Perrycrofts, on the eastern side of the A513, at the junction with the B5493 (former A453), around a half-mile north of Tamworth town centre.

Specialist status 
As a state school, it was awarded specialist status to teach as a Music College.  QEMS gained status as a Specialist Music College, under the UK Government's Specialist Schools scheme, in 2005.  This specialist status also gives funding to other departments, most notably ICT.

History

Grammar school
It was the Queen Elizabeth Grammar School on Ashby Road, a co-educational grammar school.

Comprehensive
It became a comprehensive in 1979, merging with Mercian Boys' School, a secondary modern school which moved from Hospital Street in 1960. The school was renamed Queen Elizabeth's Mercian School, a combination of the two schools' names. The "Mercian" in the school name refers to the fact that Tamworth was the headquarters of the Anglo-Saxon province of Mercia.

In April 2008, two teachers and seven pupils were injured by a bottle of silicon tetrachloride.

Arson
In November 2004, a 16-year boy was convicted of arson and sentenced for four years at Stafford Crown Court.  He started a fire at the school on Sunday 13 April 2003, causing £1.73 million in damage. Petrol had been poured through a window of room 353 to start the fire. Chase Terrace Technology College had been burnt down the year before, costing £8 million. Six fire engines were in attendance, from Staffordshire Fire and Rescue Service and Warwickshire Fire and Rescue Service, with fifty firemen. Six classrooms and an assembly hall were destroyed.

Former teachers
 Prof Geoffrey Bullough, Professor of English Language and Literature from 1946-68 at King's College London (taught English from 1924-6)

Campus 
QEMS is based in several buildings across the school. Overall, there are six buildings (Main Block, DT, RE, Middle Block, Elizabeth Block,  Girls' Gym) and mostly each department is based in one of the buildings.

Building Schools for the Future (BSF)
Along with all of the other secondary schools in Tamworth, QEMS was due to be rebuilt under the Government's BSF scheme. The addition of a Sixth-Form Academy meant that the size of the QEMS site would have been reduced, and centralised. The first stage of building work was due to begin by March 2010, but was scrapped in July 2010. Nonetheless, the school was transferred to the Landau Forte Charitable Trust's control, effective 1 September 2011, as part of a bid to receive investment from the Government to replace the lost BSF money.

Alumni
 Donald Ross Skinner, songwriter

The Queen Elizabeth Grammar School

 Phil Bennion, Lib Dem MEP from 2012–14 and 2019-20 for the West Midlands
 Dr Reginald Brain, dermatologist
 Sir John Floyer, physician who introduced the practice of measuring a pulse rate
 The Most Reverend Alan Harper, Archbishop of Armagh (Head of the Church of Ireland) from 2007–12
 Sir Robert Telford CBE, Managing Director from 1965–81 and Chairman from 1981-84 of the Marconi Company, and President from 1963-64 of the Electronic Engineering Association
 Prof Sir Ernest Titterton CMG FRS, Professor of Nuclear Physics from 1950-81 at the Australian National University, involved in the Manhattan Project
 Prof Terry Wyatt FRS, Particle Physicist
 Patience Wheatcroft, Baroness Wheatcroft, journalist

References

External links
 EduBase

News items
 Sixth form centre in March 2009
 Closure plan in January 2009
 Silicon tetrachloride in April 2008
 Arsonists in April 2003
 Arson in April 2003
 Results in August 2011

1588 establishments in England
Educational institutions established in the 1580s
Secondary schools in Staffordshire
Academies in Staffordshire
School buildings in the United Kingdom destroyed by arson
Schools in Tamworth, Staffordshire
Specialist music colleges in England